Nina L. Díaz is an executive at Viacom. She currently serves as the President of Programming and Development for VH1, MTV, and Logo Group.

In her executive positions, Díaz has primarily worked on unscripted programming, and has created or developed many record-setting reality television shows. Some of her shows include Love and Hip Hop, My Super Sweet 16, MTV Cribs, Teen Mom: Young and Pregnant, Hip Hop Squares, and Jersey Shore Family Vacation. As an independent executive, she helped develop Mob Wives for VH1 and Real Housewives of New Jersey for Bravo.

Biography 
Díaz is a Latina of Puerto Rican descent, and is the daughter of reporter David Díaz.

Career 
Diaz worked for MTV for 10 years, developing and launching My Super Sweet 16, MTV Cribs, and came up with idea for The Osbournes show on the set of Cribs. She left MTV to work as an independent producer for various networks, and helped develop hits such as Mob Wives on VH1 and Real Housewives of New Jersey on Bravo.

Diaz was hired by VH1 in 2014 where she served as Senior Vice President of East Coast Development. Diaz was hired as executive vice president of unscripted Programming and Development for MTV and VH1 in June 2016, then was promoted to head of unscripted programming in November 2016, and served in that position until April 2018. Her focus was shifting the networks towards creating more unscripted television shows, which increased viewership greatly. She has overseen the programming schedule, and helped develop or grow Love and Hip Hop, Stevie J & Joseline, Martha and Snoop's Potluck Dinner Party, Black Ink Crew, Hip Hop Squares and a reboot of America's Next Top Model. She helped develop extensions to popular previously canceled shows such as Teen Mom: Young and Pregnant, TRL, The Challenge: Champs vs. Pros and Jersey Shore Family Vacation. She helped create the U.S. version of Ex on the Beach, which had the biggest premier of any unscripted show since 2014. In 2017, she oversaw the creation of Floribama Shore and Siesta Key, which were the second and fourth new shows for the year, respectively.

In April 2018, she was promoted to the President of Programming and Development for VH1, MTV, and Logo Group.

References 

American media executives
Living people
Year of birth missing (living people)
MTV executives
Women television executives